Sos and Victoria are a husband and wife quick-change artist act. Sos and his wife Victoria are from Altrip, Germany. The pair began their act in 1991, and have earned several awards and achieving a Guinness World Record for their performances.

In 2011 they got to the semi-final of the German TV Show Das Supertalents. In 2012, they performed in at the "China International 'Great Wall' Magic Carnival" in Beijing. In 2016, they auditioned for America's Got Talent (season 11).

References

External links
 

German cabaret performers
Living people
1972 births
1978 births
German magicians
Magician duos

 America's Got Talent contestants